Cryptobatrachus is a genus of frogs in the family Hemiphractidae. They are found in Colombia and Venezuela. They are also known as backpack frogs, as the females have the habit of carrying their egg clutch on their backs until the young hatch; this behavior also occurs in the related hemiphractid genera Hemiphractus and Stefania.

Description
Cryptobatrachus have a treefrog-like habitus. Males measure  and females  in snout–vent length. Fingers have no webbing whereas the toes are webbed. The finger and toe tips bear disks that are larger on the former. Also adhesive pads are present on the penultimate subarticular tubercles on the fingers. Males lack vocal sac and these frogs appear not to vocalize.

Species 
There are six species in the genus Cryptobatrachus:
 Cryptobatrachus boulengeri Ruthven, 1916
 Cryptobatrachus conditus , 2008
 Cryptobatrachus fuhrmanni (Peracca, 1914)
 Cryptobatrachus pedroruizi Lynch, 2008
 Cryptobatrachus remotus Infante-Rivero, Rojas-Runjaic, and Barrio-Amorós, 2009
 Cryptobatrachus ruthveni Lynch, 2008

The AmphibiaWeb lists the six species above, but also Cryptobatrachus nicefori, which the Amphibian Species of the World places in the hylid subfamily Cophomantinae as "Hyla" nicefori, indicating uncertain generic affiliation.

Habitat and ecology
They are nocturnal and perch on low bushes or cling to rocks and cliffs in spray zones of waterfalls.

References

 
Hemiphractidae
Amphibians of South America
Amphibian genera
Taxa named by Alexander Grant Ruthven